Oreobates is a genus of frogs in the family Strabomantidae. Most species were formerly in the genus Ischnocnema, but were moved to this revalidated genus following a 2006 revision. Its sister taxon is Lynchius.

These frogs are found in the lower slopes of the Andes into the upper Amazon Basin from Colombia south to northern Argentina and east into western Brazil.

Description
They are generally brownish in colour. Body is robust with a short snout. The toes lack discs and fingers have reduced or absent discs; there is no webbing.

Species of the genus Oreobates lay terrestrial eggs that undergo direct development.

Species
The following species are recognised in the genus Oreobates:

References

 
Amphibians of South America
Taxa named by Marcos Jiménez de la Espada
Amphibian genera